Andrew "Andy" Banks (born 6 January 1983) is a British former professional tennis player.

A left-handed player from Wakefield, Banks was a British 18-and-under champion and reached the junior doubles final of the 2000 Wimbledon Championships.

Banks featured in the men's singles qualifying draw at Wimbledon on four occasions and twice received a wildcard into the doubles main draw, in 2004 and 2005.

Junior Grand Slam finals

Doubles: 1 (1 runner-up)

ATP Challenger and ITF Futures finals

Singles: 2 (2–0)

Doubles: 1 (1–0)

References

External links
 
 

1983 births
Living people
British male tennis players
English male tennis players
Tennis people from West Yorkshire
Sportspeople from Wakefield